Lophocampa russus is a moth of the family Erebidae. It was described by Rothschild in 1909. It is found in South America, including Peru.

References

 Natural History Museum Lepidoptera generic names catalog

russus
Moths described in 1909